The following is a list of the 798 communes in the French department of Aisne.

The communes cooperate in the following intercommunalities (as of 2020):
Communauté d'agglomération Chauny Tergnier La Fère
Communauté d'agglomération du Pays de Laon
Communauté d'agglomération de la Région de Château-Thierry
Communauté d'agglomération du Saint-Quentinois
CA GrandSoissons Agglomération
Communauté de communes du Canton de Charly-sur-Marne
Communauté de communes du Canton d'Oulchy-le-Château
Communauté de communes de la Champagne Picarde
Communauté de communes du Chemin des Dames
Communauté de communes de l'Est de la Somme (partly)
Communauté de communes du Pays de la Serre
Communauté de communes du Pays du Vermandois
Communauté de communes Picardie des Châteaux
Communauté de communes des Portes de la Thiérache
Communauté de communes Retz en Valois
Communauté de communes de la Thiérache du Centre
Communauté de communes Thiérache Sambre et Oise
Communauté de communes des Trois Rivières
Communauté de communes du Val de l'Aisne
Communauté de communes du Val de l'Oise

References

Aisne